The Afghanistan Handball Federation (AHF) is the administrative and controlling body for handball and beach handball in Afghanistan. Founded in 2004, AHF is a member of Asian Handball Federation (AHF) and the International Handball Federation (IHF).

National teams
 Afghanistan men's national handball team
 Afghanistan women's national handball team
 Afghanistan national beach handball team
 Afghanistan women's national beach handball team

References

External links
 Afghanistan at the IHF website.
 Afghanistan at the AHF website.

Handball
Sports organizations established in 2004
2004 establishments in Afghanistan
Handball governing bodies
Asian Handball Federation
National members of the International Handball Federation